Countess Auguste von Harrach zu Rohrau und Thannhausen (30 August 1800 – 5 June 1873), was the second spouse of King Frederick William III of Prussia. At the time of their marriage, the Harrach family was still not recognized as equal for dynastic purposes. Later, in 1841, a year after Frederick William's death, they were officially recognized as a mediatized family (a former ruling family within the Holy Roman Empire), with the style of Illustrious Highness, which allowed them to officially have equal status for marriage purposes to those reigning and royal families. Thus, in 1824 when the marriage occurred, it was treated as morganatic, so she was not named Queen, but was given the title Princess von Liegnitz (modern-day Legnica) and Countess von Hohenzollern. Frederick reportedly stated that he did not wish to have another queen after Queen Louise.

Early life and ancestry
Auguste was the daughter of Austrian Count Ferdinand Joseph von Harrach zu Rohrau und Thannhausen (1763–1841) and Saxon noblewoman Johanna Christiane Rayski von Dubnitz (1767–1830), whose father, Adolf Heinrich Rayski von Dubnitz (1726–1778), was the owner of Struppen Castle near Dresden. Patrilineally, she descended from Aloys Thomas Raimund, Count Harrach (1669–1742), who served as Viceroy of Naples, and Count Friedrich August von Harrach (1696–1749), Governor of the Habsburg Netherlands. Through her mother, Auguste has descended from Saxon and Bohemian nobility, including her grandmother Christiane Sophie von Leyser (1735–1806) who was a direct matrilineal descendant of Lucas Cranach the Elder and Lucas Cranach the Younger.

Marriage
Auguste met King Frederick William III at a spa in Teplitz in Bohemia in 1822. They married at Charlottenburg Palace on 9 November 1824. As Auguste was a Catholic and considered a non-dynast at the time, the marriage was initially kept a secret. In many quarters the marriage was greeted with great surprise and some initially refused to believe it. The greatest opponents of this marriage were the Mecklenburg-Strelitz cousins, the family of the King's first wife, Queen Louise. Auguste converted to Protestantism in 1826.

As a morganatic spouse, Auguste was ignored in the protocol of the court life of Berlin, ranking after all the princes and princesses of the royal family. She was not politically active and had no children. She nursed Frederick while he was dying in 1840, and it was decided to allow her to attend his funeral.

Widowhood
Auguste was given a large allowance and allowed to continue to live in the royal palace as a widow. In her later years, she often traveled to Italy and France. She was godmother to her nephew, Count Ferdinand von Harrach (1832–1915), a painter, from the Upper Silesian branch of the family.

Ancestry

References

Sources
Wichard Graf Harrach: Auguste Fürstin von Liegnitz. Ihre Jahre an d. Seite König Friedrich Wilhelms III. von Preussen (1824–1840) Stapp, Berlin 1987, .
Gisela und Paul Habermann: Fürstin von Liegnitz. Ein Leben im Schatten der Königin Luise Nicolaische, Berlin 1988 

1800 births
1873 deaths
19th-century German people
Morganatic spouses of German royalty
Burials at the Charlottenburg Palace Park Mausoleum, Berlin